Maratus hesperus is a species of Australian jumping spiders. It was first described by J. C. Otto & D. E. Hill in 2017, and has only been found in Australia.

References 

Salticidae
Spiders of Australia
Spiders described in 2017